Paradox Hotel is the ninth studio album by the progressive rock band The Flower Kings, released on 4 April 2006. It is also the band's fourth studio double-CD.

This is the band's only studio album with the drummer Marcus Liliequist (he is also on the live album Instant Delivery). While most of the band's other albums were mainly based on compositions by Roine Stolt and Tomas Bodin, this album shows more songwriting participation by other members.


Track listing

Disc One - "Room 111"

Disc Two - "Room 222"

Personnel
Tomas Bodin - keyboards, vocals
Hasse Bruniusson - marimba, percussion
Hasse Fröberg - vocals, guitars
Marcus Liliequist - drums, percussion, vocals
Jonas Reingold - bass guitar, vocals
Roine Stolt - vocals, guitars

Additional personnel
Andrés Valle - artwork

References

2006 albums
The Flower Kings albums
Inside Out Music albums